L'Oceanogràfic ("The Oceanographic") is an oceanarium situated on the dry Turia River bed to the southeast of the city center of Valencia, Spain, where different marine habitats are represented. It was designed by the architect Félix Candela and the structural engineers Alberto Domingo and Carlos Lázaro. It is integrated inside the cultural complex known as the Ciutat de les Arts i de les Ciències (City of Arts and Sciences). It was opened on 14 February 2003.

General information

It is home to 45,000 animals from 500 different species—including sharks, penguins, dolphins, sea lions, walruses, beluga whales, birds, reptiles and invertebrate—all inhabiting nine two-tiered underwater towers representing the Earth's major ecosystems. The aquariums utilize sea water pumped from the La Malva-Rosa beach.

The park is divided into ten areas: the marine areas are arranged into Mediterranean habitats, the Arctic oceans, islands, the tropics, the temperate seas and the Red Sea. The park also includes a dolphinarium, an area of mangrove swamps and marshland, and a garden with more than 80 different species of plants.

Design and operation

The steel-fiber reinforced concrete thin-shell structure was designed by renown architect Félix Candela, at age 87 in 1997, and structural engineers Alberto Domingo and Carlos Lázaro.  The distinctive hyperbolic parabola (hypars) shape of the roof is reminiscent of the Los Manantiales Restaurant in Mexico City, which Candela designed in 1958.

The Oceanographic is currently operated in partnership with the Vancouver Aquarium Marine Science Centre in Vancouver, British Columbia, Canada.

Transportation
L'Oceanogràfic can be reached via Metro, disembark at Alameda Station or through bus number 15, 25 and 95.

Articles and other references

See also
List of aquaria

External links

 
 CMD Ingenieros. Valencia
 Official page about tourism in Valencia
 L'Oceanogràfic Works Committee, Valencia

Aquaria in Spain
2003 establishments in Spain
Buildings and structures in Valencia
Concrete shell structures
Tourist attractions in Valencia
Oceanaria
Cultural infrastructure completed in 2003
Parques Reunidos
Félix Candela buildings